Molly Leach (born October 4, 1960) is an American graphic designer best known for her award-winning children's books.

Early career 

Molly Leach began her career in 1982 as a designer at Sport magazine and later designed special issues and annuals for magazines such as Sports Illustrated and Business Week.

Book design 
Her career began as a designer of books when she was recruited by illustrator Lane Smith to help with the cover of The True Story of the Three Little Pigs! (written by Jon Scieszka, Viking Books, 1989). She then designed Smith's The Big Pets and Glasses Who Needs 'Em? (Viking Books, 1991) before designing what would arguably be her most visible work, The Stinky Cheese Man and Other Fairly Stupid Tales (Viking Books, 1992).

In a 2002 Publishers Weekly article, "A New Day for Design," book designer Isabel Warren-Lynch echoed many of her colleagues when she said, "[Designer] Molly Leach opened the door in a lot of ways. When we saw The Stinky Cheese Man, designers said, 'This is what we want to do, too!' — and that it worked and sold made that possible." The Stinky Cheese Man is widely cited as having moved children's design into a new era.

In a 1998 essay in the Horn Book Magazine, "Design Matters," Jon Scieszka stated, "The job of a designer, in its most basic form, is to pick the style, size, and color of type, maybe pick the kind of paper and size of the book, and arrange how the type and illustrations are to be displayed on the pages available. But Molly does so much more than that in our books. When she’s done, the design tells as much of the story as the text and illustrations do."

In his book Side by Side (Walker Publishing 2001), Leonard S. Marcus stated, "Leach liked bold, headline-sized type like that often used for magazines. She thought that unusually big, dramatic type best communicated the fun of stories in which things continually went haywire. And she wanted each page to feel as if it were ready to burst at the margins."

In the same book Jon Scieszka is quoted, "People leafing through The Stinky Cheese Man would see that something different was going on — and realize that a good part of that 'something' was Molly's design." Smith seconded this with, "Jon and I both appreciate goofy, second-grade humor. If it were up to us, we would use all comic-book type or hand lettered type made of twigs. Molly, with her background in magazine design is different. She'll take what we do — and make it classy."

Steven Heller and Steven Guarnaccia state in Designing for Children (1994, Watson-Guptill), "while Smith's drawings are artfully primitive... it is the book design by Molly Leach that is the BRUTest of all... the type varies in weight, size and leading, but there are other witty tricks: for instance, where there isn't enough text to fill a page it is repeated, and when the character Chicken Licken is introduced the type, not the sky, falls on her head."

Other notable book designs by Leach are her redesigns of new editions of the complete Roald Dahl books; Jack Gantos's Joey Pigza books; a Dr. Seuss treasury, Your Favorite Seuss: A Baker's Dozen by the One and Only Dr. Seuss; and the 50th anniversary edition of A Wrinkle in Time by Madeleine L'Engle.

Books designed by Leach 
 The True Story of the 3 Little Pigs! (cover only), Jon Scieszka, Lane Smith (Viking, 1989)
 Glasses (Who Needs 'Em?), Lane Smith (Viking, 1991)
 The Big Pets, Lane Smith (Viking, 1991)
 The Stinky Cheese Man, Jon Scieszka, Lane Smith (Viking, 1992) – Caldecott Honor Book
 The Happy Hocky Family!, Lane Smith (Viking, 1993)
 Purr... Children's Book Illustrators Brag about Their Cats, Michael J. Rosen (Harcourt Children's Books, 1996)
 Math Curse, Jon Scieszka, Lane Smith (Viking, 1995)
 James and the Giant Peach, Roald Dahl, Lane Smith (Random House, 1996 edition)
 Speak! Children's Book Illustrators Brag about Their Dogs, Michael J. Rosen (Harcourt Children's Books, 1993)
 Squids Will Be Squids, Jon Scieszka, illustrated by Lane Smith (Viking, 1998)
 Hooray for Diffendoofer Day!, Dr. Seuss and Jack Prelutsky, illustrated by Lane Smith (Random House, 1998)
 The complete Roald Dahl library (paperback), Roald Dahl, illustrated by Quentin Blake (Puffin, 1998)
 The True Story of the Three Little Pigs: 10th Anniversary Edition, Jon Scieszka, Lane Smith (Viking,  1999)
 Baby! Talk!, Penny Gentieu (Crown, 1999)
 The Very Persistent Gappers of Frip, George Saunders, Lane Smith (McSweeney's, 2000)
 Pilgrims of Plymouth, Susan E. Goodman (National Geographic Children's Books, 2001)
 Exploring Space, Toni Eugene (National Geographic Children's Books, 2001)
 Insects, Robin Bernard (National Geographic Children's Books, 2001)
 A Tree for all Seasons, Robin Bernard (National Geographic Children's Books, 2001)
 Baloney (Henry P.), Jon Scieszka, Lane Smith (Viking, 2001)
 Pinnochio: The Boy, Lane Smith (Viking, 2002)
 The complete Roald Dahl library (hardcover), Roald Dahl, Quentin Blake (Knopf, 2002)
 The Stinky Cheese Man: 10th Anniversary Edition, Jon Scieszka, Lane Smith (Viking, 2002) – Caldecott Honor Book
 The Happy Hocky Family Moves to the Country!, Lane Smith (Viking, 2003)
 Science Verse, Jon Scieszka, Lane Smith (Viking, 2004)
 Your Favorite Seuss: A Baker's Dozen by the One and Only Dr. Seuss (Random House, 2004)
 Seen Art?, Jon Scieszka, Lane Smith (MoMA, Viking, 2005)
 Pilobolus: The Human Alphabet, John Kane (Roaring Brook, 2005)
 John, Paul, George & Ben, Lane Smith (Hyperion Press, 2006)
 Cowboy and Octopus, Jon Scieszka, Lane Smith (Viking, 2007)
 Bloom!, Maria Van Lieshout (Feiwel & Friends, 2007)
 Madam President, Lane Smith (Viking, 2008)
 Splash!, Maria Van Lieshout (Feiwel & Friends, 2008)
 Big Plans, Bob Shea, Lane Smith (Hyperion, 2008)
 The Big Elephant In The Room, Lane Smith (Hyperion, 2009)
 Peep!, Maria Van Lieshout (Feiwel & Friends, 2009)
 Princess Hyacinth, Florence Parry Heide, Lane Smith (Schwartz & Wade, 2009)
 It's a Book, Lane Smith (Roaring Brook Press, 2010)
 Tumble!, Maria Van Lieshout (Feiwel & Friends, 2010)
 Revolution, Jennifer Donnelly (Delacorte Press, 2010)
 Lulu and the Brontosaurus, Judith Viorst, Lane Smith (Atheneum Books, 2010)
 It's a Little Book, Lane Smith (Roaring Brook, 2011)
 Grandpa Green, Lane Smith (Roaring Brook, 2011) – Caldecott Honor Book
 Abe Lincoln's Dream, Lane Smith (Roaring Brook, 2012)
 A Wrinkle in Time, Madeleine L'Engle (FSG, 2012)
 Lulu Walks the Dogs, Judith Viorst, Lane Smith (Atheneum Books, 2012)
 Kid Sheriff and the Terrible Toads, Bob Shea, Lane Smith (Roaring Brook, 2014)
 The True Story of the Three Little Pigs: 25th Anniversary Edition, Jon Scieszka, Lane Smith (Viking, 2014)
 Joey Pigza Swallowed the Key, Jack Gantos (FSG, 2014)
 Joey Pigza Loses Control, Jack Gantos (FSG, 2014)
 What Would Joey Do?, Jack Gantos (FSG, 2014)
 I Am Not Joey Pigza, Jack Gantos (FSG, 2014)
 The Key That Swallowed Joey Pigza, Jack Gantos (FSG, 2014)
 Return to Augie Hobble, Lane Smith (Roaring Brook, 2015)

Personal life 

Leach is married to children's book author and illustrator Lane Smith. She lives in Connecticut and New York City.

References

External links
 An interview with Leach on the making of the 50th anniversary edition of A Wrinkle in Time

1960 births
Living people
American graphic designers
American children's book illustrators
Artists from Connecticut
Book designers